Ollenhauerstraße is one of the stations located at the Deutsche Telekom Building. This station is served by the Bonn Stadtbahn.

References

Bonn